Pinus chiapensis is a pine tree species in the family Pinaceae, and is commonly known as Chiapas pine, in Spanish as pino blanco, pinabete, or ocote. Chiapas pine was formerly considered to be a variant of pinus strobus, but is now understood to be a separate species.

Distribution
It is found in Central American pine-oak forests habitats, including in the Sierra Madre de Chiapas.
 

Introduced

See also
 Mesoamerican pine-oak forests

References

Eguiluz T.1982. Clima y Distribución del género pinus en México. Distrito Federal. Mexico.
Rzedowski J. 1983. Vegetación de México. Distrito Federal, Mexico.
Dvorak, W. S., G. R. Hodge, E. A. Gutiérrez, L. F. Osorio, F. S. Malan and T. K. Stanger. 2000. Conservation and Testing of Tropical and Subtropical Forest Species by the CAMCORE Cooperative. College of Natural Resources, NCSU. Raleigh, NC, U.S.

chiapensis
Trees of Chiapas
Trees of Guatemala
Trees of Oaxaca
Sierra Madre de Chiapas
Plants described in 1964
Endangered biota of Mexico
Endangered flora of North America
Taxobox binomials not recognized by IUCN
Flora of the Central American pine–oak forests
Flora of the Sierra Madre de Oaxaca